The Manitoba Social Credit Party ran 43 candidates in the 1953 Manitoba election, two of whom were elected.  Some of these candidates are individual biography pages.  Information about others may be found here.

The 1953 Manitoba election was determined by instant-runoff voting in most constituencies. Three constituencies (Winnipeg Centre, Winnipeg North and Winnipeg South) returned four members by the single transferable vote (STV), with a 20% quota for election. St. Boniface elected two members by STV, with a 33% quota.

The Social Credit campaign was organized by Orvis A. Kennedy and Peer Paynter, who had been responsible for the British Columbia Social Credit Party's upset victory in that province's 1952 election.  While they managed to nominate a large number of candidates in Manitoba, they were unable to repeat their success.  The party did not have an official leader.

Eric Bailey was nominated as a Social Credit candidate in Virden, but withdrew before election day.

Florence M. Bloomfield (Assiniboia)

Bloomfield finished fourth out of four candidates with 677 votes (7.83%).  The winner was Reginald Wightman of the Liberal-Progressive Party.

W.A. Wyborn (Brandon City)

Wyborn finished third out of three candidates with 1,056 votes (13.83%).  The winner was Reginald Lissaman of the Progressive Conservative Party.

K.T. Kroeker (Carillon)

Kroeker was nominated on May 11, 1953.  He finished second to Liberal-Progressive candidate Edmond Prefontaine in a two-candidate contest, receiving 1,065 votes (24.52%).

Marcel Philippe (Cypress)

Philippe was a school teacher, and a resident of St. Claude.  He had been a supporter of Social Credit for ten years before being nominated for the party.  He finished third out of three candidates with 950 votes (24.15%).  The winner was Francis Ferg of the Liberal-Progressive Party.

William Bullmore (Dauphin)

Bullmore placed first on the first count with 1,668 votes (32.19%), and was declared elected on transfers.  See his biography page for more information.

George Loeppky (Dufferin)

Loeppky was an implement dealer in Carman, and was 26 years old at the time of the election.  He was the first Social Credit candidate to be nominated in the leadup to the election.  His nomination was a surprise to most present.  Loeppky defeated Winkler principal Peter Brown and Homewood farmer Ivan Langtry.  Langtry had previously campaigned for the provincial legislature as a candidate of the Cooperative Commonwealth Federation, and was considered the favoured candidate.  Loeppky himself appears to have been surprised by the nomination, and a Winnipeg Free Press report from April 28, 1953, describes him as "slightly bewildered" in delivering his acceptance speech.

In addressing his nominators, Loeppky made the following comments: "I guess I'm not a politician.  I want to be a social crediter.  I think Social Credit offers something that political parties don't.  It's a way of life."

He finished in second place on the first count with 1,329 votes (32.63%), and lost to Liberal-Progressive candidate Walter McDonald on the second count.

Loeppky later ran for the House of Commons of Canada on two occasions, as a candidate of the Social Credit Party of Canada in the Lisgar riding.  He finished third of four candidates in the 1963 federal election with 4,099 votes, and third of four again in the 1965 election with 2,711 votes.  By this time, Loeppky was describing himself as a fur farmer.

George J. Friesen (Emerson)

Friesen finished third out of three candidates with 220 votes (4.68%).  The winner was Independent Liberal-Progressive John Solomon.

Harry Dyck (Ethelbert)

Dyck finished fourth out of four candidates with 225 votes (5.89%).  Liberal-Progressive candidate Michael N. Hryhorczuk was declared elected on the first count.

Fred C. Cook (Fairford)

Cook placed second out of four candidates on the first count with 659 votes (29.06%), and lost to Liberal-Progressive candidate James Anderson on the second count.

David Heindrichs (Fisher)

Heindrichs finished fourth out of four candidates with 144 votes (5.51%).  Liberal-Progressive candidate Nicholas Bachynsky was elected on the first count.

E.P. Brown (Gilbert Plains)

Brown was a prominent local figure, who had served as Mayor of Gilbert Plains and was a member of the hospital board.  He worked as a farm implement dealer, and formerly edited the Gilbert Plains Maple Leaf newspaper.  He finished third out of four candidates on the first count with 695 votes (22.18%), and was eliminated on transfers.

E.H. Fitch (Gimli)

Fitch finished second out of three candidates with 867 votes (26.17%).  Liberal-Progressive candidate Steinn O. Thompson was elected on the first count.

Fred Charles (Hamiota)

Charles was a Minnedosa district farmer.  He received 525 votes (15.67%), finishing third in a field of three candidates.

C.F. Rempel (Iberville)

Rempel finished fourth out of four candidates with 374 votes (9.79%).  The winner was John McDowell of the Progressive Conservative Party.

L.G. Carson (Kildonan—Transcona)

Carson was a doctor.  He finished third out of four candidates with 1,117 votes (9.23%).  The winner was Russell Paulley of the Manitoba Cooperative Commonwealth Federation.

G. Glen Paterson (Killarney)

Paterson was a farmer and auctioneer in Pilot Mound.  He was 34 years old at the time of the election, and had served with the Royal Canadian Air Force in World War II.  He won the Social Credit nomination without opposition.  In the general election, he finished third out of three candidates with 666 votes (18.09%).

James William Lee Tully (Lakeside)

Tully was a farmer in Curtis.  He received 786 votes (19.26%), finishing second against Liberal-Progressive candidate Douglas Campbell, the Premier of Manitoba.  Campbell was elected on the first count.

R.W. Doherty (Lansdowne)

Doherty finished third out of three candidates with 709 votes (16.54%).  Liberal-Progressive candidate Matthew R. Sutherland won on the second count.

Damase Dufresne (La Verendrye)

Dufresne was nominated on May 5, 1953.  He lost to Liberal-Progressive candidate Edmond Brodeur in a two-candidate contest, receiving 1,576 votes (41.70%).

Albert O'Donnell (Manitou—Morden)

O'Donnell finished third out of three candidates with 758 votes (22.18%).  Progressive Conservative candidate Hugh Morrison was declared elected on the second count.

Gilbert Hutton (Minnedosa)

Hutton finished second out of three candidates on the first count with 1,401 votes (36.10%), and was unexpectedly elected on transfers with the second count.  See his biography page for more information.

Wilbert James Tinkler (Morris)

Tinkler was president of the Manitoba Social Credit League for much of the 1940s and 1950s.  He was nominated over the Rev. H. Hartfield on May 8, 1953.  He finished third out of three candidates in Morris with 844 votes (23.69%).  See his biography page for more information.

Dollard E. Lafreniere (Mountain)

Lafreniere was born in 1921, and died in 1987.  He was a resident of St. Boniface for most of his life, and worked a receiving station agent (telegraph operator) with Canadian National Railways.  In 1952, he worked in Baldur in the Mountain constituency.

He finished second in with 894 votes (28.44%).  The winner was Liberal-Progressive incumbent Ivan Schultz.

Lafreniere later campaigned for the Social Credit Party of Canada in the 1957 federal election, in the St. Boniface riding.  He finished fourth out of five candidates with 3,872 votes.  The winner was Louis Deniset of the Progressive Conservative Party.

Charles John McKinnon (Norfolk—Beautiful Plains)

McKinnon was a farmer in the Wellwood district.  He placed second on the first count with 1,394 votes (28.50%), and was defeated by Liberal-Progressive candidate Samuel Burch on the second count.

McKinnon later campaigned for the House of Commons of Canada as a candidate of the Social Credit Party of Canada, in the 1957 federal election.  He received 4,247 votes in Portage—Neepawa, finishing third against Progressive Conservative candidate George Clark Fairfield.

Bernie H. Rempel (Portage la Prairie)

Rempel was 45 years old at the time of the election, and was a foreman with the Canadian Pacific Railway.  He finished third out of three candidates with 784 votes (20.82%).  The winner was Liberal-Progressive candidate Charles Greenlay.

Rempel later campaigned for the House of Commons of Canada as a candidate of the Social Credit Party of Canada in the 1962 federal election.  He received 1,669 votes in Springfield, finishing last in a field of four candidates.  The winner was Joe Slogan of the Progressive Conservative Party.

Victor Peters (Rhineland)

Peters was the principal of Horndean school at the time of the election, and was formerly a Liberal.  He won the nomination over Arnold Hiebert, a lumber merchant from Plum Coulee.  There were approximately 100 people at the nomination meeting.

He received 964 votes (30.73%), losing on the first count to Liberal-Progressive candidate Wallace Miller.

Earl D. McIntyre (Roblin)

McIntyre was born in Roblin.  He served with the Canadian Army in World War II, and was wounded in France in 1944.  After the war, he returned to Roblin and worked as a farmer.  He finished third out of four candidates with 366 votes (12.48%).  Liberal-Progressive candidate Ronald Robertson was elected on the first count.

C.E. Toutant (Rockwood)

Toutant first campaigned for the Manitoba legislature in the 1941 provincial election, as a Social Credit candidate opposing the coalition government of the day.  He was defeated in Fairford by Liberal-Progressive candidate Stuart Garson, a prominent cabinet minister.

Toutant finished third out of three candidates in 1953 with 389 votes (12.98%).  Independent Liberal-Progressive Robert Bend was elected on the first count.

Charles H. Beswatherick (Russell)

Beswatherick finished fourth out of four candidates with 511 votes (12.38%).  Independent Liberal-Progressive candidate Rodney S. Clement finished first on the first count, and was elected on transfers.

Tony Lemoine (St. Boniface)

Lemoine was a carpenter, and was the only Social Credit candidate in St. Boniface for the 1953 election.  He supported the open sale of alcohol.  He finished sixth on the first count with 1,420 votes (7.26%), and was eliminated after the third count with 1,537 votes (7.86%).

A "J.S.A. Lemoine" contested La Verendrye as a Social Credit candidate in the 1941 provincial election, and placed second against Liberal-Progressive candidate Sauveur Marcoux.  This may have been the same person.

Osborne A. Earle (St. Clements)

Earle was a former councillor in East Kildonan, representing the suburb's second ward.  He lost his council seat in the 1952 municipal election, falling to Kenneth A. Davidson by a margin of 611 votes to 383.

He won the Social Credit nomination without opposition on May 12, 1953.  In the general election, he finished third out of four candidates with 959 votes (16.53%).  Liberal-Progressive candidate Stanley Copp won on the first count.

E.H. Hartfield (St. George)

Hartfield was a reverend.  He initially tried for the Social Credit nomination in Morris, but lost to Wilbert James Tinkler.  He lost St. George against Liberal-Progressive Christian Halldorson in a straight two-candidate contest, receiving 321 votes (15.92%).

Antoine Pineau (Ste. Rose)

Pineau was a garageman.  He was chosen as the Social Credit nominee for the general election, and continued his candidacy through to a deferred election on July 6, scheduled after Liberal-Progressive candidate Maurice Dane MacCarthy died on election night.  He finished third out of three candidates with 891 votes (33.43%).  The winner was Liberal-Progressive Gildas Molgat, who had been selected to replace MacCarthy.

William G. Storsley (Springfield)

Storsley was a farmer, and had served on the town council of Beausejour for five years prior to the 1953 election.  He finished second on the first count with 1,365 votes (35.50%), and lost to Liberal-Progressive candidate William Lucko on the second count.

Delbert Leroy Downs (Swan River)

Downs was a recent arrival from Alberta, which had been under a Social Credit government since 1935.  He owned a restaurant in Swan River.  Downs required four ballots to win the Social Credit nomination, defeating Swan River Mayor George E. Scalf, W.I. Steen, D.A. Woods, A. Helps and N. Tyler.

In the general election, he finished second on the first count with 1,508 votes (31.21%) and was subsequently defeated on transfers.  The winner was Progressive Conservative incumbent George Renouf.

Later in the same year, Downs ran for the Social Credit Party of Canada in the northern Manitoba riding of Churchill for the 1953 federal election.  He finished third with 2,490 votes.  The winner was George Dyer Weaver of the Liberal Party.

William H. Calvert (The Pas)

Calvert endorsed free enterprise policies during the election, claiming that such policies would lead to higher wages.  He finished second out of three candidates with 1,668 votes (20.67%).  Liberal-Progressive candidate Francis Jobin was elected on the first count.

C.A. Ferguson (Turtle Mountain)

Ferguson worked as a farmer, approximately six miles north of Boissevain.  His nomination was arranged by leaders of the Social Credit Party, rather than by a local convention.  He received 507 votes (16.01%), finishing third out of three candidates.  The winner was Errick Willis, leader of the Progressive Conservative Party of Manitoba.

Ferguson sought election again in the 1958 provincial election, and again finished third in Turtle Mountain with 316 votes.  Willis again won the constituency.

Edward Percival Brown (Winnipeg Centre)

Brown owned a radio business.  He was the highest-ranking Social Credit candidate in Winnipeg Centre for the 1953 election, receiving 763 votes (3.71%) on the first count.  He was eliminated after the sixth count, having increased his total to 1,132 votes (5.50%) through transfers.  This was still well below the 20% quota needed for election.

Emil A. Johnson (Winnipeg Centre)

Johnson used the campaign slogan, "For Progress with Leadership, Vote Social Credit".  He finished twelfth out of fourteen candidates on the first count with 354 votes (1.72%), and was eliminated after the second count with 449 votes (2.18%).

Patrick J. Mulgrew (Winnipeg Centre)

Mulgrew finished thirteenth out of fourteen candidates with 286 votes (1.39%), and was eliminated after the first count.

Nicholas Hallas (Winnipeg North)

During the closing days of the campaign, Hallas referred to himself as a crusader rather than a politician.  (Winnipeg Free Press, 5 June 1953).  He finished tenth out of eleven candidates in Winnipeg North on the first count with 917 votes (4.24%), and was eliminated after the second count with 928 votes (4.29%).

Doreen Benjamin (Winnipeg South)

Benjamin finished eighth out of nine candidates on the first count with 612 votes (2.10%), and was eliminated after the fourth count with 1,068 votes (3.67%).

Jemima F. Webster (Winnipeg South)

Webster was a teacher, and a longtime advocate of social credit principles.  She had previously lived in Alberta, where the Social Credit Party had been in government since 1935.  She received 566 votes (1.94%) on the first count, finishing ninth out of nine candidates.  Webster was eliminated after the third count, having increased her total to 594 votes (2.04%).

Politics of Manitoba